In Greek mythology, Aspalis was a local heroine from Melite in Phthia whose story was apparently meant to provide an etiology for the local surname and cult of Artemis. As in certain Artemis mythology, she hanged herself and her body disappeared.

Mythology 
The exact story of Aspalis, known from Antoninus Liberalis, is as follows. Melite was once ruled by a tyrant so cruel that the citizens dared not pronounce his real name, dubbing him Tartarus. He would order for the most beautiful girls to be brought to him and made them his concubines against their will. When he sent for Aspalis, daughter of Argaeus, the girl hanged herself rather than be violated. Her brother Astygites swore to avenge her death before her body would be taken out of the noose. He put on his sister's clothes, hiding a sword underneath, and in this disguise got into the tyrant's palace and killed him. The citizens threw the tyrant's body into a river which from that circumstance became known as Tartarus, and crowned Astygites with a wreath to express gratitude to him. As they were going to give burial to Aspalis, they found that her body had disappeared, but a wooden statue of Artemis was discovered on the spot (It is believed that Artemis turned her body into statue out of pity). It became a cult object, and was referred to as "Aspalis Ameilete Hekaerge"; а young she-goat was sacrificed to the goddess every year via being hanged by the city maidens, this being a ritual imitation of Aspalis' suicide.

Aspalis was speculated to have originally been a western Semitic hunting goddess identified with Artemis.

See also 

 Britomartis
 Side
 Titanis

Notes

References 
 Antoninus Liberalis, The Metamorphoses of Antoninus Liberalis translated by Francis Celoria (Routledge 1992). Online version at the Topos Text Project.
 Pausanias, Description of Greece with an English Translation by W.H.S. Jones, Litt.D., and H.A. Ormerod, M.A., in 4 Volumes. Cambridge, MA, Harvard University Press; London, William Heinemann Ltd. 1918. . Online version at the Perseus Digital Library
 Pausanias, Graeciae Descriptio. 3 vols. Leipzig, Teubner. 1903.  Greek text available at the Perseus Digital Library.

Hunting goddesses
Women in Greek mythology
West Semitic goddesses
Epithets of Artemis
Metamorphoses into inanimate objects in Greek mythology